Rossview High School is a high school located in Clarksville, Tennessee. It is part of the Clarksville-Montgomery County School System. The current building was completed in 2001 for $28 million. The school's mascot is Squawk The Hawk, and the school's colors are red and gold, though many sports teams prefer the more 'stylish' black and red. A special tutoring and peer advising program was implemented after "inadequate performance" in the 2003 No Child Left Behind tests, which helped to bring the school up to all federal benchmarks by 2005. The school far exceeds state achievement score averages for each grade for Reading/Language arts as well as for Math.

Athletics
Rossview High School has had a total of five state championships brought back to the school since opening back in 2001. Wrestling, Track and Field, and Girls Golf have brought home individual championships. Girls Golf has also won as a team twice. Many of the sports teams, such as boys and girls varsity tennis and boys baseball, have won district titles. Boys baseball has won 7 district titles. Its most current title came in 2015 under first year Head Coach Parker Holman. In 2014 it was the 5AAA Regional champions under Coach Jason Rice and has been to the playoffs 10 times in its history. In both 2013 and 2014, led by head coach Ronald Lambert, Rossview's football program has come in 2nd place in district play and has made multiple playoff appearances since its opening in 2001.

References

External links
Rossview High School
Clarksville-Montgomery County School System

Public high schools in Tennessee
Schools in Montgomery County, Tennessee
Education in Clarksville, Tennessee